Lisi may refer to:

People

Surname
Antony Garrett Lisi (born 1968), American theoretical physicist
Ben de Lisi (born 1955), American fashion designer
Joe Lisi (born 1950), American actor
Mark Lisi (born 1977), American soccer player
Mary M. Lisi (born 1950), American Senior Judge
Riccardo Galeazzi-Lisi (1891–1968), Italian medical charlatan
Rick Lisi (born 1956), Canadian baseball player
Simona Lisi, Italian dancer, choreographer and actress
Virna Lisi (1937-2014), Italian film actress
Wang Lisi (1991), Chinese footballer
Zyber Lisi (born 1919), former Albanian football player

Given name
Lisi Harrison (born 1976), Canadian author
Lisi Raskin (born 1974), American artist

Ethnic groups
Lisi people, a collective term for three Chadian ethnic groups

Places
Lisi, Iran, a village in Mazandaran Province, Iran
Lisi Lake, Tbilisi, Georgia

Other uses
Lisi, the city goddess at Sumerian Abu Salabikh